The Drobotfor is a right tributary of the river Zeletin in Romania. It discharges into the Zeletin in Chicerea. It flows through the villages Slobozia Nouă, Slobozia, Stănișești, Balotești, Benești and Gura Crăiești.

References

Rivers of Romania
Rivers of Bacău County